Nixon  Korir is a Kenyan politician and is currently the nominated principal secretary for State Department for Lands and Physical Planning in Kenya. .

His role as the Secretary Youth Affairs involved  oversight of youth-related functions of the Government of Kenya including the Uwezo Fund , Youth Enterprise Development Fund, the National Youth Service and the Kenya National Volunteers Programme.

He graduated from Moi High School Kabarak in 2004 and enrolled in the University of Nairobi (UON) in 2006.  He later qualified as a lawyer, having graduated  from UON in December 2011.

Student Leadership

In 2007, while an undergraduate, Korir served as a Congressman at the University of Nairobi and in 2008, he became the School of Law President. In 2009, he became Secretary General of the Students' Organization of Nairobi University (SONU).  He was also active in the 2010 referendum as a national youth leader of the NO camp led by William Ruto.  (The NO camp was defeated by the YES camp of Prime Minister Raila Odinga.)

Impact on Youth Affairs
Korir has been instrumental in the formulation and the implementation of the Kenya National Volunteer Programme. Under his leadership as the Chair of the Kenya Graduate Volunteer programme, three key objectives have been set: to promote national cohesion, to create job opportunities for 30,000 unemployed youths, and to improve learning in public primary schools.

The volunteer programme seeks to promote national cohesion by ensuring that graduates are posted to counties far from their home. The volunteers are also boarded by host families so that graduates can experience different cultures and religions.

Personal life
Korir is married to Berryl Zoraima.  They have three children together 2 daughters and a son.

Political career 
After graduating from the UON, he got employed by H.E. Hon. William Ruto to serve as his first personal assistant while Ruto was the MP for Eldoret North Constituency. Korir is the former Member of Parliament for Langata Constituency a position that he lost to Felix Odiwour aka "Jalas" . He made history as the first Kalenjin to be elected as a Member of Parliament in Nairobi particularly in an area that was dominated by leadership from the Orange Democratic Movement (ODM) party. He is also the former Secretary Youth Affairs under the executive office of the President. He was also the founding Chairman of the United Republican Party, and remains a member.  Korir also served as the Executive Director of the United Republican Party (URP) secretariat.

On the 4th March 2013, Korir stood for the Langata national assembly seat on an URP ticket with 17,740 votes, finishing at a distance second after Joash Olum of ODM who had 25,394 votes.

See also
 Kenya National Assembly elections in Nairobi, 2013

References

External links
 https://www.facebook.com/NixonKorirMP
 http://www.myaspirantmyleader.com/mps/nairobi-region.html?id=364
 https://web.archive.org/web/20130220195536/http://iebc.or.ke/index.php/media-center/press-releases/item/nominated-candidates-for-the-4th-march-2013?category_id=7

Living people
Year of birth missing (living people)
Kenyan politicians